This is a yet-unnamed Powelliphanta species, provisionally known as Powelliphanta sp. from Mount Owen.  This is one of the amber snails. It is an undescribed species of large, carnivorous land snail, a terrestrial pulmonate gastropod mollusc in the family Rhytididae.

Conservation status
Powelliphanta sp. from Mount Owen is classified by the New Zealand Department of Conservation as Nationally Endangered.

References

 Powell A W B, New Zealand Mollusca'', William Collins Publishers Ltd, Auckland, New Zealand 1979 
 Department of Conservation Recovery Plans
 New Zealand Department of Conservation Threatened Species Classification

Gastropods of New Zealand
Powelliphanta
Undescribed gastropod species
Endemic fauna of New Zealand
Endemic molluscs of New Zealand